Juris Upatnieks (born 7 May 1936 in Riga) is a Latvian-American physicist and inventor, and pioneer in the field of holography.

Upatnieks fled the Latvia with his parents at the close of World War II, seeking asylum in Germany.  In 1951 the family emigrated to the United States.  He attended high school in Akron, Ohio, and studied electrical engineering at the University of Akron, where he was awarded a bachelor's degree in 1960. Thereafter he studied at the Institute of Science and Technology of the University of Michigan, where he earned a master's degree in electrical engineering in 1965.  From 1973 to 1993 he worked at the Environmental Research Institute of Michigan and was an Adjunct Professor, Electrical and Computer Engineering Department at University of Michigan in Ann Arbor.  There he taught a laboratory course in optics until 1996.  From 1993 to 2001 he was a consultant with Applied Optics in Ann Arbor.  From 1996 to 2001 he was also a researcher with the faculty of Mechanical Engineering and Applied Mechanics at the University of Michigan.

In 1964 he demonstrated, with Emmett Leith, the first three-dimensional holograms in the United States and together with Leith published a series of technical papers from 1962 to 1964.

As of 2009 Upatnieks holds 19 patents. Among them is an holographic gunsight.

In 1975 he received the R. W. Wood Prize of the Optical Society of America and 1976 the Holley Medal of the American Society of Mechanical Engineers. He was named "Inventor of the Year" in 1976 by the American Association for the Advancement of Invention and Innovation. He is a member of the Optical Society and of International Society for Optical Engineering, as well as a member of the Latvian Academy of Sciences, whose Great Medal he received in 1999.

Patents 
Upatnieks is holder or co-holder of twenty United States Patents in the fields of holography and coherent radiation.

References 

21st-century American physicists
Latvian emigrants to the United States
1936 births
Scientists from Riga
University of Akron alumni
University of Michigan College of Engineering alumni
University of Michigan faculty
Living people
20th-century American inventors
20th-century Latvian inventors
Latvian World War II refugees